Sardar Bahadur Sir Sobha Singh, OBE (1890 – 18 April 1978) was an Indian civil contractor, prominent builder and real estate developer of Delhi. He is the father of Indian writer Khushwant Singh.

Early life

Sardar Bahadur Sobha Singh was born in 1890, in the village of Hadali in Khushab, Shahpur District – then part of British India (now Pakistan). He was the elder of the two sons of Sujan Singh and Lakshmi Devi, the younger one being Sardar Ujjal Singh, who was a member of Parliament in India from the state of Punjab.

After a few years at school in Amritsar, he joined his father's business of civil construction dealing in the laying of railway tracks and the digging of tunnels.

Career

When Hardinge, the Viceroy of India, announced the plan to move the British Indian capital city to Delhi was along with the Coronation Durbar for King George V and the Queen Mary, would take place in Delhi in December 1911, Sujan Singh and 22-year-old Sobha Singh, who was then a contractor working on the Kalka-Shimla railroad, shifted base to Delhi as building contractors. Building contracts then being given out. Sujan Singh-Sobha Singh were accepted as senior-grade contractors. Plans for the new city were drawn immediately after the Coronation Durbar.

The foundation stones had been laid by the King and Queen. After this the architects, Edwin Lutyens and Herbert Baker wanted to change the site from where the foundation stones had been laid to  Raisina hill and the village of Malcha. Sobha Singh had the foundation stones removed during the night and took them 11 km across the city and replanted them on the new site. The construction of the plans were taken up after World War I (1914–1918).

For the South Block and War Memorial Arch (now India Gate), Sir Sobha was the sole builder. He also worked on some parts of the Viceregal House (now Rashtrapati Bhavan) and Vijay Chowk.

Sir Sobha bought as much land in Delhi as he could. He bought several extensive sites at as little as Rs 2 per square yard, freehold. There were few other takers, and he came to be described as adhi dilli ka malik (the owner of half of Delhi). He constructed many residential and commercial buildings, including the Connaught Place market complex, as well as the Chelmsford, A.I.F.A.C.'s Hall, Broadcasting House (All India Radio), the National Museum, Dyal Singh College, T.B. Hospital, Modern School, Deaf and Dumb School, St. Columba's School, Red Cross Buildings and Baroda House. Outside Delhi, he built the High Court and Government Medical College at Nagpur and the Pasteur Institute at Kasauli.

Sir Sobha Singh was a person of modest education but his success as a builder made him one of the wealthiest persons of Delhi; also, a prominent member of the social elite. He also became the first Indian president of the New Delhi Municipal Council and held the post four times, in 1938, 1942, and 1945-46.  Appointed an Officer of the Order of the British Empire (OBE) in the 1938 Birthday Honours, he was subsequently appointed a member of the Council of State  He was knighted in the 1944 Birthday Honours. He also built Sujan Singh Park, near Khan Market New Delhi, New Delhi's first apartment complex, which only had bungalows till then, in 1945, designed by Walter Sykes George and named after his father. Sir Sobha Singh died in Delhi on 18 April 1978.

Legacy

Sardar Bahadur Sir Sobha left a large part of his private estate to a charitable trust, the Sobha Singh Trust, which maintains homes and hospices for the terminally ill and aged all over the country, most recently it built, a dharamsala, within the Guru Teg Bahadur Hospital complex, in New Delhi in 2005

He also presided over some institutions funded by it like the Deaf and Dumb School and the Modern School. Among his last grants  was one for Bhagat Puran Singh's Pingalwara home for the destitute in Amritsar.

In 2006, India International Centre (IIC) organized the first Sir Sobha Singh Memorial Lectures, in which the inaugural lecture titled, "My father, the builder", was given by his son, writer Khushwant Singh.

Testimony against Bhagat Singh 

Sobha Singh's public image was marred by his sketchy testimony against Bhagat Singh.

Personal life

The younger brother of Sir Sobha Singh, Sardar Ujjal Singh (1895–1983), later became a parliamentarian, and governor of Tamil Nadu (1966–71).

Sir Sobha was married to Sardarni Vira Bai (Varyam Kaur, Lady Singh). They had four sons: Bhagwant Singh, Khushwant Singh (journalist and author), Brigadier Gurbux Singh and Daljit Singh, and a daughter, Mohinder Kaur, who was the mother-in-law of Rukhsana Sultana (wife of her son Shivinder Singh Virk) and paternal grandmother of Indian film actress Amrita Singh.

References

External links
 "Sir Sobha Singh (1890-1978)". All About Sikhs.
 Jahagirdar, Archana (13 October 1997). "Khushwant Singh". Outlook.

1890 births
1978 deaths
Date of birth missing
Place of death missing
Knights Bachelor
Indian Knights Bachelor
Officers of the Order of the British Empire
Indian Sikhs
People from Delhi
Punjabi people
Businesspeople from Delhi
Members of the Council of State (India)
Sardar Bahadurs